Lin He (born January 1974) is a Chinese-American molecular biologist. She is an associate professor of cell and developmental biology at the University of California, Berkeley, in the Department of Molecular and Cell Biology, where she leads a lab focusing on identifying non-coding RNA which may play a role in tumorigenesis and tumor maintenance.

Biography
Lin He was born in January 1974. She grew up in Beijing, with her ancestral home in Fujian Province. She was admitted to the Department of Biology of Tsinghua University in 1992 and graduated 1997. She earned a Ph.D. from Stanford Medical School in 2003, working with Gregory S. Barsh.  She was a postdoctoral fellow at Cold Spring Harbor Laboratory from 2003 to 2007 with Greg Hannon before joining the faculty at the University of California, Berkeley in 2008.

Lin He's research focuses on the role that non-coding microRNAs play in the development and maintenance of tumors. Specifically, she has found that miR-34, a specific microRNA family, plays an essential role in blocking tumor cells from replicating in lung cancers, among others. Her current research is focused on understanding the mechanism that miR-34 plays in tumor suppression. Her lab is also studying the miR-17/92 family. Differential expression of this microRNA cluster has been observed in B-cell lymphomas, suggesting that miR-17/92 members are potential human oncogenes. Her work has appeared in Nature, Nature Genetics, and Science.

Awards
Lin He received the prestigious MacArthur Fellowship in 2009.

References

External links
  profile at UC Berkeley

1974 births
Living people
American molecular biologists
Chinese emigrants to the United States
MacArthur Fellows
Stanford University School of Medicine alumni
Tsinghua University alumni
University of California, Berkeley College of Letters and Science faculty
American women biologists
Chinese women biologists
Women molecular biologists
21st-century American women scientists
Chinese molecular biologists
Biologists from Beijing
Educators from Beijing